Olonkinbyen (literally The Olonkin Town) is the only settlement on the Norwegian island of Jan Mayen (aside from isolated cottage huts such as Puppebu). It was named after Russian-Norwegian explorer Gennady Olonkin.

The only inhabitants on the island are the 18 personnel, 14 working for the Norwegian Armed Forces and 4 for the Norwegian Meteorological Institute. Olonkinbyen houses the staff that operate the meteorological observation station, Loran-C station, Jan Mayensfield air field and other infrastructure. The meteorological observation service staff are responsible for the radiosonde releases and synoptic weather observations. The crew of the meteorological station is engaged for six months at a time.

Supplies are delivered eight times a year by aircraft. Fuel and heavy goods are transported by boat during the summer. The settlement generates its own electrical power via three generators.

In January 2021, two employees of the Armed Forces died in an avalanche.

Climate
Olonkinbyen has a tundra climate (Köppen classified as ET), the warmest month is August and the coldest month is March.

References

External links
INA Station at Olonkinbyen
View of Olonkinbyen
Aerial view of Olonkinbyen

Geography of Jan Mayen
Populated places of Arctic Norway